Fataleka may refer to:
Fataleka constituency, a parliamentary constituency in the Solomon Islands
Fataleka language, a language spoken in the Solomon Islands